Sergeac is a commune in the Dordogne department in Nouvelle-Aquitaine in southwestern France.

Population
The area of Sergeac is 10.71 km2.

Gallery

See also
Communes of the Dordogne département

References

External links

Communes of Dordogne